Koupossitéré Camara (born 15 December 1986) is a Togolese international footballer who plays as a midfielder for ASKO Kara.

External links

1986 births
Living people
Togolese footballers
Togo international footballers
Association football midfielders
21st-century Togolese people